Brian Robins was born in Cheltenham, England, but spent most of his early life in Bournemouth. An early interest in music took him into the record industry, by which time he had realised that he had no future as a performer. This, coupled with an interest in history, led him to undertake the four-year History of Music Diploma as an external student at the University of London. After completing this course with Honours, he was immediately offered a place as a part-time adult education lecturer, an occupation he found extremely rewarding. By this time he was also working on the extensive manuscript journals of the 18th-century English amateur composer, John Marsh, an undertaking that ultimately resulted in his edited version being published in the United States in 1998.  His most recent book is a study of catch and glee culture in 18th-century England. He has also written chapters for two anthologies, essays for scholarly journals and presented papers at academic conferences, in addition to contributing entries in the revised New Grove Dictionary of Music and Musicians and The Oxford Dictionary of National Biography.

Away from academic work, Brian Robins was a reviewer of early music CDs for Goldberg Early Music Magazine (Spain) from its inception until it ceased publication in 2008, also serving as English-language editor and consultant. For many years a regular reviewer for Fanfare Magazine, he currently reviews for Early Music Review and Opera Magazine. He has broadcast for BBC Radio 3 and is a former member of the awards panel of the Stanley Sadie International Handel Recording Prize. An interdisciplinary and contextual approach to the history of the arts is of great importance to him, his wide reading including many aspects of 17th- and 18th-century history.

Notes

Further reading
Robins, Brian, ed (1998) 

 Brian Robins: "Regietheater – The Death of Opera?" on Regietheater

External links
 

English music historians
Living people
Year of birth missing (living people)